= Camélia (restaurant) =

Restaurant in Los Angeles, California, U.S.

- Interactive map of Camélia

Restaurant information
- Location: 1850 Industrial Street, Los Angeles, California, 90021, United States
- Coordinates: 34.0356°N 118.2326°W

Camélia is a restaurant in Los Angeles, California. It was included in The New York Times's 2024 list of the 50 best restaurants in the United States.
